Mis Número 1...40 Aniversario is a compilation album released by Juan Gabriel on August 5, 2014. The album has been nominated for Album of the Year at the Latin American Music Awards of 2015.

Track listing

Charts

Weekly charts

Year-end charts

References

Juan Gabriel compilation albums
2014 compilation albums
Sony Music Latin compilation albums
Spanish-language compilation albums